Jan Jensen may refer to:

 Jan Jensen (ice hockey) (born 1971), Danish ice hockey goaltender
 Jan Jensen (rower), Danish lightweight rower
 Jan Jensen (skiing) (1944–2002), Norwegian sports official
 Jan Krogh Jensen (1958–1996), Danish mobster and member of the Bandidos Motorcycle Club
 Jan Olav Jensen (born 1959), Norwegian architect